Makhachkala, previously known as Petrovskoye (1844–1857) and Port-Petrovsk (1857–1921), or by the local Kumyk name of Anji, is the capital and largest city of Dagestan, Russia. Makhachkala is the fourth-largest city in the Caucasus, the largest city in the North Caucasus and the North Caucasian Federal District, as well as the third-largest city on the Caspian Sea. The city is extremely ethnically diverse, with a minor ethnic Russian population.

The city's historic predecessor is the port town of Anji (Andzhi), which was located in Kumykia, and which was a part of possessions of Tarki state, the capital of Kumyks known from the 8th century.

The city was named Petrovskoye after Peter the Great. After gaining city status in 1857, the Petrovskoye fortress was renamed Petrovsk-Port. After the Russian Revolution, Petrovsk-Port was renamed Makhachkala on May 14, 1921, after Bolshevik revolutionary . On the same day, it became capital of the newly formed Dagestan ASSR. After the dissolution of the Soviet Union, the city became the capital of the Republic of Dagestan.

Makhachkala is an important economic, educational, scientific, and cultural centre of the North Caucasus. The city is a major Russian seaport on the Caspian Sea, and a transport hub. It is one of the fastest-growing cities in Russia, and is currently going through a construction boom.

History

Makhachkala's historic predecessors were the towns of Tarki and Anji (or Andzhi, or Anji-kala), dating their history, according to some sources, back to Khazar times. Some chronicles suggest that it was the name of a citadel of Khazarian capital of Semender, which was called Anji-kala. 

During the first Muslim conquests of Dagestan, it was exposed to an influx of Muslims. During the reign of Umayyad Caliph Hisham b. Abdülmelik (724-743), the caliph's brother Maslama succeeded in establishing Islamic dominance in the region with his conquests. In the following years, one of the Umayyad commanders, Marwan b. Mohammed also organized successful raids to Dagestan. However, the Islamic domination in the region ended in 796 (180 AH) when the Khazars captured Derbend. In the early days of the Abbasids, the struggle against the Khazars continued. This struggle, which lasted for two centuries, ended with the victory of the Muslim Arabs. In 815, Sheikh Abu Ishaq and Sheikh Mohammed al-Kindi entered Dagestan with a volunteer army of about 2000 people and tried to spread Islam. In the second half of the 11th century, the Seljuk Turks took a part of the region under their control. Dagestan was invaded by the Mongols in 1222. The Cumans (Kipchaks), who ruled in the north of the Black Sea and the Caucasus, played an important role in the Turkification of the region. Later on, the Ilkhanids, Golden Horde Khanate, Timurids, Shirvanshahs and Safavids dominated Dagestan respectively. Dagestan came under Ottoman rule between 1578-1606.

The Safavids started operations to spread Shiism in Dagestan at the beginning of the 19th century but were met with fierce resistance of Dagestanis. Shah Abbas II established a significant influence in Dagestan in 1639. It started to attract the attention of the Russians from the 17th century onwards. It remained the scene of a struggle for influence between Iranians, Russians and Ottomans from the beginning of the 17th century.

When the Safavids began to lose their power at the beginning of the 17th century, the people of Dagestan united under the leadership of Çolak Surhay Khan of the Gazikumukh Khanate, and they won a victory against Iran in 1712. In order to continue their success, he took the people of Dagestan, who asked for help from the Ottoman administration, under his protection by sending gifts to the sultans of the Sublime Porte.

Although the Russians could not hold on to the interior of Dagestan, they expanded their sovereignty towards the Caspian coast and could only be stopped in front of Baku with the help of the Ottoman forces under the command of Mustafa Pasha. With a treaty signed between Russia and Iran in 1724, Derbend, Baku and some other places in the region were left to Russia. As a result of his struggles against the Russians, Nadir Shah captured the south of Dagestan, Derbend and Baku with the Rasht Treaty signed in 1732, and some lands between the Sulak and Kura (Kür) rivers with the 1735 treaty. After 1747, the Russians regained influence in Dagestan.

In the 1840s, after Russian Empire seized the Kumyk plateau, Anji-kala became the place where fort Petrovskoye was founded. A town status was granted to the fortress in 1857. The Russian name of the city was Petrovskoye—after the Russian Tsar Peter the Great, who waged war in the region in 1722 during his Persian Campaign. However, among the local Kumyks the city was still known as Anzhi-Qala, The Pearl Fortress (Qala means fortress or a city with walls, while Anzhi / Inzhi / Inji means pearl in Kumyk). There is also still a hill called Anji-arqa, meaning the hill of Anji.

After gaining town status in 1857, the Petrovskoye fortress was renamed Petrovsk-Port, sometimes simply Petrovsk.

In 1894, a railway line linked the city to Vladikavkaz (in present-day North Ossetia-Alania) and Baku (in present-day Azerbaijan). However, despite the development, a report from 1904 detailed the spread of malaria and unsuitable drinking water in the city.

In January 1919, during the Russian Civil War, the British No. 221 Squadron Royal Air Force based themselves at Petrovsk.  In March they were joined by No. 266 Squadron and both squadrons were involved in bombing operations against Bolshevik forces in Astrakhan and elsewhere. In August 1919 both squadrons were withdrawn from Petrovsk. The city was invaded by the Red Army in March 1920.

As part of the Soviet revolution, place names relating to monarchy or religion were changed, and thus on 14 May 1921, Petrovsk was renamed Makhachkala, after Dagestani revolutionary Magomed-Ali 'Makhach' Dakhadaev. On the same day, it became capital of the newly formed Dagestan Autonomous Soviet Socialist Republic. The city incurred major damage during an earthquake on 14 May 1970. The city was briefly renamed Shamilkala during the disintegration of the Soviet Union in honor of the Dagestani freedom fighter Imam Shamil.

The area was used as a Soviet-era naval testing station, leaving behind a curious sea fort off nearby Kaspiysk.

A report of the International Crisis Group from 2013 describes the city as being "a city of almost one million and gained spectacular economic resources due to a construction boom, skyrocketing land prices, substantial federal funds for reconstruction, infrastructure, transport, housing, courts and administrative services. But even a short visit revealed acute problems, including dirty streets, dilapidated buildings, inadequate utilities, hectic construction, lack of planning and poorly organised public transport".

Deportation of the Kumyk population and expansion of Makhachkala 
On April 12, 1944, a decision was made to resettle the inhabitants of Kumyk villages of Tarki, Kyakhulay and Alburikent, which owned the surrounding areas, to the settlements of the deported Chechens. Most of the released land was distributed to the Makhachkala city council (6243 out of 8166 hectares), in addition to the collective farms of the mountainous regions and industrial enterprises of Makhachkala.

After the return of the Kumyk population in 1957, the lands of the collective farms were not restored, personal property was also lost, many houses were occupied by people resettled from mountainous areas. The historical monuments of the ancient city were destroyed and used as construction materials for the infrastructure of Makhachkala.

2022 anti-mobilization protests
Protests and violent police clashes occurred in Makhachkala, as was the case in other Russian cities, in response to the 2022 Russian mobilization, as well as a call-up of 110 men from the village of Endirey to be conscripted into the ongoing Russian invasion of Ukraine. According to the BBC, 301 Dagestani soldiers died in Ukraine, more than in any other region of Russia.

Economy
The most important industrial sector is the oil refineries, as well as mechanical engineering and textile factories. Numerous administrative and educational institutions are based in the city, including a regional research centre of the Russian Academy of Sciences with around 20 research departments. The city is also the media centre of the region. Numerous newspapers are published in Makhachkala, including Dagestanskaya Pravda and the Islamic As-Salam. In addition, several regional television stations are based in the city.

Administrative and municipal status
Within the framework of administrative divisions, it is, together with eight urban-type settlements and six rural localities, incorporated as the City of Makhachkala—an administrative unit with the status equal to that of the districts. As a municipal division, the City of Makhachkala is incorporated as Makhachkala Urban Okrug.

City divisions

For the purposes of administration, the city is divided into three city districts, from west to east: Kirovsky, Sovetsky and Leninsky. In May 2015, these three city districts were granted municipal status.

Symbols
The coat of arms and flag of Makhachkala were adopted on 15 December 2006. The coat of arms shows the city's historic fortress in silver on a red field, with flames coming from either tower and a solar symbol above. It is supported by a golden eagle on each side, a crown on top, and crossed anchors (representing its maritime history) entangled with grapevines at the bottom.

In proportions of 2:3, the flag displays the main shield of the city's coat of arms.

Unrest
Makhachkala is close to areas of fighting and therefore it and the surrounding region has a heavy security service presence. On 25 November 2011, a protest took place in Makhachkala attended by up to 3,000 people demanding an end to illegal activities perpetrated by the security services.

On December 15, 2011, Gadzhimurat Kamalov, a Russian investigative journalist and founder of the independent Chernovik newspaper was shot dead in an apparent assassination.

Demographics
The population of Makhachkala includes (2010 Census data):
Avar nations (26.7%)
Kumyks (19.17%)
Dargin nations (15.3%)
Lezgins (12.71%)
Laks (12.35%)
Russians (5.4%)
Tabasarans (2.02%)
Rutuls (1.24%)
Azerbaijani (0.91%)

Transportation

The city is served by Uytash Airport, a regional airport providing connections to other Russian cities. Russian Railways via the North Caucasus Railway provides freight and passenger traffic to and from Makhachkala.

The Caspian Sea International Port handles crude oil, petroleum, construction materials, grain, cargo and timber and operates 24 hours a day. The port offers communications with the rest of Russia, as well as with Belarus, Ukraine, the Baltic states, Iran, Turkey and Central Asia. A railyard at the port connects the port to the North Caucasus Railway network.

Sports

The city's main football team, FC Anzhi Makhachkala, played at the 26,500-seat Anzhi Arena.

Founded in 1991, the side returned to the Premier League in 2009 and in January 2011 were purchased by Dagestani commodities billionaire Suleyman Kerimov, whose investments allowed the club to sign players such as Brazilian World Cup winner Roberto Carlos and Cameroonian striker Samuel Eto'o who, during his time at the club, became the world's highest paid player. The club lived its golden era, finished in the Top 5 for two consecutive seasons (2011-12 and 2012-13) and qualified for the UEFA Europa League, reaching the round of 16 on both occasions.

However, after 2013, due to unrest in the region, the players moved to live and train in Moscow, while the local matches in Makhachkala were guarded by armed patrols. This situation, followed by severe budget cuts, made the club lost most of its key players and went on to finish bottom of the table in the 2013–14 Season.

Climate
Makhachkala has a cold semi-arid climate (Köppen: BSk) with warm, relatively dry summers and, cool relatively moist winters. The strong rain shadow of the Caucasus and the ability of the Siberian High to freely move westwards from its source in the Tibetan and Mongolian plateaus makes the climate quite dry, although frequently overcast throughout the winter, which is owing to the relatively low latitude and nearness to the Caspian Sea very mild by Russian standards. Summers are sunnier but also dry as the region is exposed to steep descending vertical velocity from the Indian monsoon, and the greatest rainfall occurs in the autumn season from September to November. October 1987 with  has been the wettest month, whilst no precipitation occurred in February 1958, October 1974 and April 1986.

Economy and culture

Churches 
 Cathedral of the Assumption
 Church of the Holy Equal-to-the-Apostles Prince Vladimir

Lighthouse 
 Makhachkala Lighthouse is an operating lighthouse. Landmark of the city.

Notable people
Shamil Zavurov, Eagle sports president and former MMA lightweights champion
Ruslan Agalarov, former association football player
Malik Akhmedilov, editor
Kamalutdin Akhmedov, association football player
Eduard Akuvaev, artist
Gasret Aliev, Soviet hero
Ali Aliyev, amateur boxer
Abdulla Alishayev, TV host
Hizgil Avshalumov, Soviet novelist, poet and playwright
Mishi Bakhshiev, writer and poet
Ali Gadzhibekov, association football player
Shamil Gitinov, Armenian wrestler
Ali Isayev, Azeri wrestler
Gadzhimurat Kamalov, editor
Rustam Khabilov, mixed martial artist
Kuramagomed Kuramagomedov, wrestler
Shamil Lakhiyalov, association football player
Gadzhimurad Nurmagomedov, Olympic Armenian wrestler
Jamaladdin Magomedov, Azeri wrestler
Khadzhimurad Magomedov, Olympic Azeri wrestler
Rashid Magomedov, mixed martial artist
Islam Makhachev, mixed martial artist, current UFC Lightweight Champion
Aleksandr Maslov, former association football player
Magomed Musaev, Olympic Kyrgyz wrestler
Sharif Mukhammad, Afghan football player
Marid Mutalimov, Olympic Kazakh wrestler
Vladimir Nazlymov, sabre fencer and coach
Khabib Nurmagomedov, mixed martial artist, former UFC Lightweight Champion
Eduard Puterbrot, artist
Muslim Salikhov, kickboxer
Serder Serderov, association football player
Sharif Sharifov, Olympic Azeri wrestler
Ruslan Sheikhau, Belarusian wrestler
Ilyas Shurpayev, television journalist
Nikita Timoshin, association football player
Anatoly Yagudaev, sculptor. He held an honorary title of People's Artist of the Russian Federation
Zalimkhan Yusupov, Olympic Tajik wrestler

Twin towns – sister cities

Makhachkala is twinned with:

 Biskra, Algeria
 Hatten, Germany
 Ndola, Zambia
 Oldenburg, Germany
 Sfax, Tunisia
 Siping, China
 Yalova, Turkey
 Spokane, USA

Notes

References

Bibliography

External links

Makhachkala organizes charity iftars
Badkhen, Anna. "Everyone in Makhachkala Packs a Gun." The Moscow Times. May 31, 2001.

 
Populated places established in 1844
1844 establishments in Europe
1844 establishments in the Russian Empire
Populated coastal places in Russia
Populated places on the Caspian Sea
Port cities and towns in Russia
Port cities in Europe
Port cities and towns of the Caspian Sea
Renamed localities in Russia